The 2017 Women's World Junior Team Squash Championships was held in Tauranga, New Zealand. The event took place from 25 to 29 July 2017.

Seeds

Group stage

Pool A

Pool B

Pool C

Pool D

Knockout stage

Ninth to fourteenth place

Bracket

Finals

Bracket 

5–8th place bracket

Semi-finals

Final

Final standing

See also
World Junior Squash Championships

References

External links 
World Junior Squash Championships 2017 Official Website
World Junior Squash Championships 2017 SquashInfo Page

W
Squash tournaments in New Zealand
2017 in New Zealand sport
2017 in women's squash
World Junior Squash Championships
International sports competitions hosted by New Zealand